(), known as Liga ARCO Mexicana del Pacífico or LMP is a ten team professional baseball winter league based in Northwestern Mexico founded in 1945.  The league's champion takes part in the Caribbean Series each year.

The sixty eight-game regular season is split in two halves. After each half, the teams are awarded points. The first place team earns ten points, while the last place team earns three and a half points. At the end of the regular season the total amount of points are added up from both halves to determine playoff positioning. The top eight teams advance.

History
In 1945, a group of people led by Teodoro Mariscal established the Liga de la Costa del Pacífico. The league's first season (1945–46) started with four teams: Tacuarineros de Culiacán, Ostioneros de Guaymas, Queliteros de Hermosillo and Venados de Mazatlán. Mariscal was appointed as the league's first president. In 1947 the league expanded with two new teams: Arroceros de Ciudad Obregón and Pericos de Los Mochis.

In 1958, only four teams participated, all from the state of Sonora: Rojos de Ciudad Obregón, Rieleros de Empalme, Naranjeros de Hermosillo and Ostioneros de Guaymas. Since all the participant teams were from Sonora, the league changed its name to Liga Invernal de Sonora. In 1959, Mayos de Navojoa replaced Ciudad Obregón. In 1962, Ciudad Obregón and Los Mochis returned to the league. In 1965, Mazatlán and Tomateros de Culiacán joined the league, which changed its name for third time to Liga Invernal Sonora-Sinaloa.

In 1970, the league changed its name to the current Liga Mexicana del Pacífico and joined the Confederación de Béisbol Profesional del Caribe, thus participating for the first time in the 1971 Caribbean Series.

In 2020, ARCO purchased naming rights to the league, thus it changed its name to Liga ARCO Mexicana del Pacífico. Two teams joined the LMP for the 2020 season: Sultanes de Monterrey, that became the first team to play in the two professional baseball leagues in Mexico, and Algodoneros de Guasave, that returned to the Mexican Pacific League after disappearing in 2014.

Teams

Champions

Teams in gold Caribbean Series champions

Championships (1945–1958)
 Mazatlán (Antiguos Venados): 5 (1946, 1953, 1954, 1955, 1958)
 Culiacán (Tacuarineros): 5 (1949, 1950,1951 1952, 1956)
 Hermosillo (Queliteros/Presidentes/Naranjeros): 2 (1947, 1957)
 Guaymas (Antiguos Ostioneros): 1 (1948)

Championships by team

Records

Single season batting

Single season pitching

Defunct teams

See also
Mexican League
Mexican Professional Baseball Hall of Fame
Mexico baseball awards
Sport in Mexico

References

External links
LMP website 

Pac
Winter baseball leagues
Professional sports leagues in Mexico